The Silver Chair is a series shown on BBC television in 1990. It is the third and final series of The Chronicles of Narnia that ran from 1988 to 1990.

Barbara Kellerman returned in a new role as the Green Lady; Barbara had previously played Old Hag and the White Witch in previous seasons.

The six-part series followed the 1953 book in great detail and was filmed in various locations including Peak Cavern, Haddon Hall, Bakewell, Derbyshire and the Duchy of Lancaster.

Cast
David Thwaites as Eustace Scrubb
Camilla Power as Jill Pole
Tat Whalley as Chief Bully
Ailsa Berk and William Todd-Jones (puppet performance) and Ronald Pickup (voice) as Aslan
Geoffrey Russell as King Caspian
Richard Henders as Prince Rilian
Big Mick as Trumpkin
Warwick Davis as Glimfeather and Reepicheep
William Todd-Jones as Centaur
Mike Edmonds as Second Owl
Roy Boyd as Lord Drinian
Barbara Kellerman as Green Lady
Tom Baker as Puddleglum
Ailsa Berk as Dragon
Nick Brimble as Giant Porter
Joshua Fenton as Young Giant
Stephen Reynolds as Giant King
Lesley Nicol as Giant Queen
Patsy Byrne as Giant Nanny
Melanie Gibson as Giant Chambermaid
June Ellis as Giant Cook
Amanda Loy-Ellis as Giant Cook’s Helper
Christopher Birch as Old Giant 
Bill Wallis as Warden
Joe Hall as Sentry
Jack Purvis as Golg
Jean Marc Perret as Young Caspian
Jeffrey Perry as Mr. Tumnus
Henry Woolf as Doctor Cornelius

Episodes

References

External links

TV 1990
1990 fantasy films
BBC children's television shows
British television shows based on children's books
1990 British television series debuts
1990 British television series endings